The 1902–03 season was Burslem Port Vale's fifth consecutive season (ninth overall) of football in the English Football League. Finishing in ninth place for the second time in three years, it would take just over two decades for the club to again reach the heights of a top ten second tier finish. Their success was down mainly due to their home form, and in fact a club record 29 away games without a win began on 17 January 1903. Adrian Capes would become the club's top scorer for the third successive season.

Overview

Second Division
The pre-season saw tough-tackling left-back Arthur Hartshorne arrive from Wolverhampton Wanderers, whilst left-half W. Perkins and forward William Loverseed both arrived from Newark. In September, experienced right-half Arthur Rowley arrived from Bristol Rovers.

Vale had an awful start to the season, winning just one of their first ten games. However this run ended with five wins in their following seven games to take them back to the safety of mid-table. Their 4–2 win over Blackpool at Bloomfield Road on 3 January 1903 was their last away win until the 1904–05 season. Their finish to 1902–03 was strong, winning their last seven home games. However they finished with 34 points from 34 games, seventeen points from the promotion zones, and nine points clear of the re-election zones.

Adrian Capes was top scorer with eighteen goals in 37 games, missing just one league game. Goalkeeper Harry Cotton played 36 games; Billy Heames, W. Perkins, Ernest Mullineux, Arthur Hartshorne, Bert Eardley, Arthur Rowley, George Price, and William Loverseed were all constant figures in the first eleven. At the end of the campaign all the major players were kept on, with no big signings made.

Finances
A financially difficult season, in March 1903 the directors decided to sell defenders Arthur Hartshorne and Ted Holdcroft to Stoke for over £500. This gave the club a profit of £112 on the campaign. Poor attendance figures saw gate income fall by £200 from the previous season. The club's debt was totalled at £171, and subsequently the club's reserve side was moved from The Football Combination to the North Staffordshire League to save on travel costs.

Cup competitions
In cup competitions, Vale performed poorly, falling at the first hurdle in the Staffordshire Senior Cup, Birmingham Senior Cup, and Bass Charity Vase. Losing to rivals Stoke in the county cups: 2–0 at home in the Birmingham Cup, and 5–3 away in the Staffordshire Cup replay following a 1–1 draw at home. In the Charity Vase they were conquered by Second Division rivals Burton United 5–1 away in a replay, following a 1–1 draw at home. The club failed to qualify for the FA Cup, after losing 2–1 away at St. Helens Recreation's short, sloped, boggy pitch.

League table

Results

Burslem Port Vale's score comes first

Football League Second Division

Results by matchday

Matches

FA Cup

Birmingham Senior Cup

Staffordshire Senior Cup

Bass Charity Vase

Top scorers

Transfers

Transfers in

Transfers out

References
Specific

General

Port Vale F.C. seasons
Burslem Port Vale